3-Amino-1,2,4-triazole (3-AT) is a heterocyclic organic compound that consists of a 1,2,4-triazole substituted with an amino group.

3-AT is a competitive inhibitor of the product of the HIS3 gene, imidazoleglycerol-phosphate dehydratase. Imidazoleglycerol-phosphate dehydratase is an enzyme catalyzing the sixth step of histidine production.

3-AT is also a nonselective systemic triazole herbicide used on nonfood croplands to control annual grasses and broadleaf and aquatic weeds. It is not used on food crops because of its carcinogenic properties. As an herbicide, it is known as aminotriazole, amitrole or amitrol.

Amitrol was included in a biocide ban proposed by the Swedish Chemicals Agency and approved by the European Parliament on January 13, 2009.

Applications in microbiology 
By applying 3-AT to a yeast cell culture which is dependent upon a plasmid containing HIS3 to produce histidine (i.e. its own HIS3 analogue is not present or nonfunctional), an increased level of HIS3 expression is required in order for the yeast cell to survive. This has proved useful in various two-hybrid system, where a high-affinity binding between two proteins (i.e., higher expression of the HIS3 gene) will allow the yeast cell to survive in media containing higher concentrations of 3-AT. This selection process is performed using selective media, containing no histidine.

1959 cranberry contamination 
On November 9, 1959, the secretary of the United States Department of Health, Education, and Welfare Arthur S. Flemming announced that some of the 1959 crop was tainted with traces of the herbicide aminotriazole. The market for cranberries collapsed and growers lost millions of dollars. However, Ocean Spray recovered by expanding the market for cranberry juice, which, although widely available for sale, was before then not popular. This ensured cranberry growers would not have to rely mostly on Thanksgiving and Christmas for sales, which was the case until the notorious 1959 incident.

References 

Enzyme inhibitors
Herbicides
Endocrine disruptors
Triazoles
Cranberries